The 2012 WAC men's basketball tournament, was held March 7–10, 2012 at the Orleans Arena in Paradise, Nevada, United States to crown a champion of the Western Athletic Conference. The winner of the tournament received an automatic bid to the 2012 NCAA tournament.  The 2012 Championship game was televised on ESPN2 at 9:00 pm Pacific Time.

Format
With the departure of Boise State to the Mountain West Conference, WAC Commissioner Karl Benson announced during the basketball preseason teleconferences that the league would change its postseason basketball tournament to a regular quarterfinal format, getting rid of the double-bye format used in 2011.  This format was to be used for 2012 only; the format was to be re-evaluated for 2013 after new five new teams came in and three schools departed for a total of 10 participating institutions in 2012–13.

Schedule

Bracket

Game Summaries

References

External links
2012 WAC Men's Basketball Tournament

Tournament
WAC men's basketball tournament
WAC men's basketball tournament
WAC men's basketball tournament
Basketball competitions in the Las Vegas Valley
College basketball tournaments in Nevada
College sports tournaments in Nevada